Clifton Urban Forest is an urban forest project currently being developed near the affluent neighborhood (and seaside) of Clifton in Karachi, Pakistan. Over 40,000 tree saplings and 45 species of trees including moringa, sukhchain, oleander, date palms, and wild almonds have been planted there using the Miyawaki technique. Founded and directed by Masood Lohar on January 8, 2021, the area covers around 200 acres along the seaside, with the saplings being brought in from Lohar's nursery in Hyderabad, Pakistan, which was paid for with his pension from his former job at the UNDP Global Environmental Finance Unit.

The project's aim is to improve the climatic conditions and resilience of Karachi, and to solve the city's problems of high temperatures, runoff water, and bad air quality. To achieve this, the end goal is to plant around one million Salvadora persica in the area, known locally as peelu. The land along the beach being planted used to be a trash dumping ground with heaps of debris, waste, litter, and more. The garbage was moved and formed mounts along the edge of the ocean, forming a barrier against the sea's salt spray.

References 

Urban forests in Pakistan
Karachi
2021 establishments in Pakistan
Geography of Karachi
Clifton, Karachi